Joseph Massey may refer to:

Joe Massei (1899–1971), or Joe Massey, American gangster of Italian-Irish origins
Joseph Massey sen. (1827–1900), Australian musician with a family of organists 
Joseph Massey (cricketer) (1895–1977), English cricketer
Joseph Massey (poet), see New Sincerity

See also
Joseph Massie (disambiguation)